"Little Wing" is a 1967 song written by Jimi Hendrix and recorded by The Jimi Hendrix Experience.

Little Wing may also refer to:

 Little Wing (film), 2016 Finnish-Danish drama film directed by Selma Vilhunen
 Little Wings, an indie rock and folk band founded by Kyle Field
 Little Wing Kelly, the nickname of Bessie Bardot
 Little Wing Autogyros, Inc., an American aircraft manufacturer
 Little Wing Autogyro, a series of conventional one and two place autogyros
 Little Wing Roto-Pup, an American autogyro from the 1990s